Khamney (Khamni) is a rural locality (a selo) in Zakamensky District, Republic of Buryatia, Russia. The population was 744 as of 2010. There are 20 streets.

Geography 
Khamney is located 52 km east of Zakamensk (the district's administrative centre) by road. Usanovka is the nearest rural locality.

References 

Rural localities in Zakamensky District